Matthew Amroliwala (born 1962) is a British television newsreader, who presents Global with Matthew Amroliwala on BBC World News each weekday at 1500 hrs GMT. He has also been an occasional relief presenter of the BBC News at One  on BBC One. He also presented Crimewatch alongside Kirsty Young from January 2008 until March 2015.

Early life and education
Amroliwala was educated at the King's School, Ely, Cambridgeshire and then Durham University. He graduated in 1984, having read Law and Politics.

Career
After working as a chartered accountant, he joined the BBC and, in 1990, became a BBC network television correspondent. In 1997, he joined the BBC News Channel as a presenter of the channel's evening programmes and from the beginning of 2001, he has presented the late afternoon news programme, first with Jane Hill and then with Maxine Mawhinney. In April 2006, he was re-united with Hill on the 11 am–2 pm shift until March 2013 when the duo moved to the 2 pm–5 pm slot on Tuesday to Friday; Emily Maitlis co-presented on Mondays.

He has covered many major news stories, including reporting extensively from Northern Ireland. He has also reported from Bosnia on the fall of Srebrenica and travelled throughout the Balkans during the conflict in Bosnia. Since January 2008, he has co-presented the programme Crimewatch with Kirsty Young and Rav Wilding (later Martin Bayfield), specialising in the solved cases, but missed  the March 2015 episode, and was covered by Jason Mohammad.

Since 8 September 2014, he has presented the flagship programme Global on BBC World News, the BBC’s international news channel. On 27 June 2016 he presented his first edition of World News Today on the channel and BBC Four. In February 2023, it was announced Amroliwala would become a chief presenter on the BBC’s new news channel for both UK and international viewers due to launch in April.

Personal life
Amroliwala and his wife Jackie Long, a journalist, live in London; they have five children.

References

External links 
 BBC Newswatch profile

Living people
1962 births
BBC newsreaders and journalists
British television presenters
Alumni of St Chad's College, Durham
People educated at King's Ely
People from Leeds
BBC World News
British people of Indian descent
British people of Parsi descent
Television personalities from Yorkshire